Satori Kato was a Japanese chemist. Kato was initially thought to be the inventor of the first soluble instant coffee whilst working in Chicago, after filing a patent in 1901 and exhibiting the product at the Pan-American Exposition until it was realised that David Strang of Invercargill, New Zealand had invented the product two years earlier.

References

20th-century Japanese chemists
Year of birth missing
Year of death missing